Blanck is a surname and may refer to:

Fred C. Blanck (1881–1965), American food scientist involved in the founding of the Institute of Food Technologists
Hubert de Blanck (1856–1932), Dutch-born professor, pianist and composer who lived in Cuba
Julio Blanck (1954–2018), Argentine journalist
Mattias Blanck of Family Groove Company, an unsigned American four piece jam band in Chicago, Illinois
Olga de Blanck (1916–1998), Cuban pianist, guitarist and composer
Peter Blanck (born 1957), American academic, psychologist and lawyer
Ronald R. Blanck (born 1941), 39th Surgeon General of the United States Army
Sarah Blanck (born 1977), Australian sailor
Sebastian Blanck (born 1976), American musician and figurative painter
Thomas Hamilton Blanck (died 1895), Old West criminal operating in the Pacific Northwest

See also
Blanck Mass, British electronic solo project by Benjamin John Power
Hubert de Blanck Theater, small theatre in the Vedado district of Havana, Cuba, named after Hubert de Blanck
Blanc
Blank (disambiguation)